Hermeto Pascoal (born June 22, 1936) is a Brazilian composer and multi-instrumentalist. He was born in Lagoa da Canoa, Alagoas, Brazil. Pascoal is a significant figure in the history of Brazilian music, mainly known for his abilities in orchestration and improvisation, as well as being a record producer and contributor to many Brazilian and international albums.

Biography

Early life and career

Pascoal comes from Northeastern Eastern Brazil, in an area that lacked electricity at the time he was born. He learned the accordion from his father and practiced for hours indoors, as, being albino, he was incapable of working in the countryside with the rest of his family.

Hermeto's career began in 1964 with appearances on several Brazilian recordings alongside relatively unknown groups. These now-classic albums and the musicians involved (Edu Lobo, Elis Regina, Cesar Camargo Mariano) established widely influential new directions in post-bossa nova Brazilian jazz.

In 1966, he played in the Sambrasa Trio, with Airto Moreira and Humberto Clayber; they released only one album, Em Som Maior. Then he joined Trio Novo (Airto Moreira, Heraldo do Monte, Theo de Barros) and in 1967 the group, renamed Quarteto Novo, released an album that launched the careers of Pascoal and Moreira. Pascoal would then go on to join the multi-faceted group Brazilian Octopus.

International fame

Pascoal initially caught the international public's attention with an appearance on Miles Davis's 1971 album Live-Evil, which featured him on three pieces, which he also composed. Davis allegedly called Pascoal "the most impressive musician in the world". Later collaborations involved fellow Brazilian musicians Airto Moreira and Flora Purim. From the late 1970s onward, he has mostly led his own groups, playing at many prestigious venues, such as the Montreux Jazz Festival in 1979. Other members of the group have included bassist Itibere Zwarg, pianist Jovino Santos-Neto and percussionists Nene, Pernambuco, and Zabelê.

Known as o Bruxo (the Wizard), Pascoal often makes music with unconventional objects such as teapots, children's toys, and animals, as well as keyboards, button accordions, melodica, saxophones, guitars, flutes, voices, various brass and folkloric instruments. He uses nature as a basis for his compositions, as in his Música da Lagoa, in which the musicians burble water and play flutes while immersed in a lagoon: a Brazilian television broadcast from 1999 showed him soloing at one point by singing into a cup with his mouth partially submerged in water. Folk music from rural Brazil is another important influence in his work.

Between 1996 and 1997, Pascoal worked on a book project called Calendário do Som, which contains a song for every day of the year, including February 29, so that everyone would have a song for their birthday.

He was married to Ilza da Silva, to whom he dedicated many compositions, from 1954 until her death in 2000. They had six children, Jorge, Fábio, Flávia, Fátima, Fabiula, and Flávio, and many grandchildren. Hermeto was later married to Aline Morena from 2003 until 2016, while living in Curitiba, Paraná, Brazil. 

He has since returned to the Jabour neighborhood in Bangu, Rio de Janeiro, where he spends much of his time composing, rehearsing and hosting musicians from all over the world.

In 2019, his album Hermeto Pascoal e Sua Visão Original do Forró won the Latin Grammy Award for Best Portuguese Language Roots Album.

Discography

As leader or member
 1961: Conjunto Som 4 (with Conjunto Som 4)
 1966: Em Som Maior (with Sambrasa Trio)
 1967: Quarteto Novo (with Quarteto Novo)
 1969: Brazilian Octopus (with Brazilian Octopus)
 1970: Hermeto Pascoal (solo debut, reissued on CD as Brazilian Adventure)(featuring Googie Coppola)
 1973: A música livre de Hermeto Pascoal
 1977: Slaves Mass
 1977: Trindade
 1979: Zabumbê-bum-á
 1979: Ao vivo Montreux Jazz Festival
 1979: Nova história da Música Popular Brasileira (compilation)
 1980: Cérebro magnético
 1981: Planetário da Gávea
 1982: Hermeto Pascoal & Grupo (reissued by Westwind Germany on CD as The Legendary Improviser. The reissue appears to be a copy from vinyl.)
 1984: Lagoa da Canoa, Município de Arapiraca
 1986: Brasil Universo
 1987: Só não toca quem não quer
 1988: Hermeto solo: por diferentes caminhos
 1992: Festa dos deuses
 1993: Instrumental no CCBB (with Renato Borghetti)
 1998: Música!: o melhor da música de Hermeto Pascoal (compilation)
 1999: Eu e eles
 2002: Mundo verde esperança
 2006: Chimarrão com rapadura (with Aline Morena)
 2010: Bodas de Latão (with Aline Morena)
 2013: Hermeto Pascoal: The Monash Sessions
 2017: No Mundo dos Sons
 2017: Viajando com o som (recorded in 1976)
 2017: Natureza Universal
 2018: Made of Music 
 2018: E sua visão original do forró

As contributor
 1956: Ritmos Alucinantes, by Clovis Pereira
 1959: Batucando no Morro, by Pernambuco do Pandeiro e seu regional
 1970: Natural Feelings, by Airto Moreira
 1970: Electric Byrd, by Donald Byrd
 1970: Sergio Mendes Presents Lobo, by Edu Lobo
 1970: It Could Only Happen with You, by Duke Pearson
 1970: Live-Evil, by Miles Davis
 1971: Cantiga de Longe, by Edu Lobo
 1971: Seeds on the Ground, by Airto Moreira
 1975: Di Melo, by Di Melo
 1976: Imyra, Tayra, Ipy, by Taiguara
 1976: Open Your Eyes You Can Fly, by Flora Purim
 1976  Goldenwings, by Opa
 1977: Orós, by Raimundo Fagner
 1978: Robertinho no passo, by Robertinho de Recife
 1979: Sivuca, by Sivuca
 1979: Live in Montreux, by Elis Regina
 1980: Stone Alliance, by Márcio Montarroyos
 1983: Cordas vivas, by Heraldo do Monte
 1984: Ponto do músicos, by Nenê
 1986: Balãozinho, by Eduardo Gudin
 1986: Cordas mágicas, by Heraldo do Monte
 1986: Pindorama, by Pau Brasil
 1987: Flávio Pantoja, by Flavio Pantoja
 1987: Dharana, by Dharana
 1996: Brasil Musical - Série Música Viva - Pau Brasil E Hermeto Pascoal|Brasil Musical - Série Música Viva (with Pau Brasil)
 1998: Maritmo, by Adriana Calcanhotto (on track "Canção por Acaso")
 2000: Oferenda, by Aleuda
 2000: Nação Nordestina, by Zé Ramalho (on track "Violando com Hermeto")
 2003: Serenata: The Music of Hermeto Pascoal, by Mike Marshall and Jovino Santos Neto
 2006: Roda Carioca, by Jovino Santos Neto
 2023: Beams, by Dan Costa (composer)

References

External links

 The official site
 Interview and extensive information and discography

People from Alagoas
Samba musicians
Brazilian jazz (genre) flautists
Brazilian jazz (genre) saxophonists
Latin jazz flautists
Latin jazz pianists
Latin jazz guitarists
Latin jazz saxophonists
People with albinism
Miles Davis
Brazilian jazz pianists
Brazilian jazz composers
Brazilian jazz guitarists
Brazilian jazz keyboardists
Brazilian multi-instrumentalists
Melodica players
1936 births
Living people
Brazilian saxophonists
Male saxophonists
Male jazz composers
20th-century pianists
20th-century guitarists
20th-century saxophonists
21st-century pianists
21st-century guitarists
21st-century saxophonists
20th-century jazz composers
21st-century jazz composers
Brazilian male composers
Male pianists
Quarteto Novo members
Sambrasa Trio members
Latin Grammy Award winners
20th-century flautists
21st-century flautists